Dark Angael is a PC video game by Vicarious Visions. It is a 2D run-and-gun shoot-'em-up action-adventure platform game released on September 30, 1997.

Gameplay

Plot

Development
Dark Angael was the company's first original game, as Synnergist has been created on commission by British publisher 21st Century. The game has elaborate detail including lengthy scripts, a detailed storyline, original music, actor-spoken dialogue, video segments, and impressive graphics. Altogether, the game took up a space of as much as 100 million bytes of space, and cost $250,000 to produce in total. Guha Bala, President of Vicarious Visions, said "It's a thrill when you know you're working on something like that...[we] get a charge out of writing [gamed] that push the limits of technology".

The game went on sale at the company's website in October 1997, and was distributed electronically by gaming magazines. A French-language version of the game was created and published in various French-speaking nations such as France, French-speaking Africa, Belgium, Canada and Switzerland. A German version was also set to debut February 1998. At the time of the game's release, Vicarious Visions had "seven full-time employees and squadron of contractors".

Critical reception
The game has received mixed reviews.

Power Unlimited gave the game a 7.8 out of 10, commenting "DA is a nice platform game. A dark storyline, lots of action and smooth gameplay. Good for a few days of excitement." Adrenaline Vault, The (AVault) rated the game 3 Stars, writing "Dark Angael requires a patient hand. It's like a song that fails to grab you the first time you hear it, yet after repeated listenings, you grow familiar with its rhythms and subtleties, and find yourself completely engaged by its singular spirit." 7Wolf Magazine gave Dark Angel 5.5 out of 10, saying "Graphics, quite nice for its time, of course, now looks old-fashioned, as well as sound. Flat painted backdrops, sprites and explosions are the same waddling moving monsters." Meristation gave it a 5 out of 10, writing "It is not the best approach to the very similar gameplay of Blizzard's Diablo idea or Duke Nukem. I thought I had found something different ... but it only brought back good memories of other old games." Joystick (French) rated the game 10 out of 100, writing "This is not a game, it's a hazing. The kind of thing that would have made me giggle on the Atari ST." Computer Gaming World gave the game a ratin of 3 out of 5 stars,writing "This is a decent enough game with good potential for keeping players busy for hours".

References

1997 video games
Run and gun games
Video games developed in the United States
Video games featuring female protagonists
Windows games
Windows-only games
Vicarious Visions games